Genevieve Townsend (December 4, 1897 – May 1, 1927) was an American stage and film actress. She was born in the United States, but later moved to Britain. In the mid-1920s she had several lead roles in British silent films. She died in Switzerland at the age of 29 in 1927.

Selected filmography
 The Secret Kingdom (1925)
 A Girl of London (1925)
 The Chinese Bungalow (1926)

References

External links
 

1897 births
1927 deaths
American film actresses
American silent film actresses
American expatriate actresses in the United Kingdom
People from Freeport, Illinois
20th-century American actresses